Idar railway station is a small railway station in Sabarkantha district, Gujarat, India. Its code is IDAR. It serves Idar city. The station consists of two platforms. The platforms are not well sheltered. It lacks many facilities including water and sanitation. Idar lies on former metre-gauge track of Khedbrahma–Himatnagar–Ahmedabad. The line is closed since 2017.

Major trains 

 Khedbrahma–Ahmedabad MG Passenger (unreserved)
 Ahmedabad–Khedbrahma MG Passenger (unreserved)

References

Railway stations in Sabarkantha district
Ahmedabad railway division